Stuart Wainwright "Moose" Cochran was an American football end for the Milwaukee Badgers of the National Football League (NFL).

References

People from Ashland, Wisconsin
Players of American football from Wisconsin
Milwaukee Badgers players
Chicago Maroons football players
1897 births
1979 deaths